Nova Olímpia is a municipality in the state of Mato Grosso in the Central-West Region of Brazil.

See also
List of municipalities in Mato Grosso

References

Municipalities in Mato Grosso